The Kattsund-Koster dyke swarm is a collection of dykes of Mesoproterozoic age in southeastern Norway and the West Coast of Sweden. The most prominent outcrops are in the Koster Islands in Sweden and Kattsund in Norway, hence the name. The dykes are made up of tholeiitic diabase and some dykes of intermediate composition. Some dykes are deformed and metamorphosed into amphibolite. Radiometric dating has shown that the dyke swarm is about 1421 million years old. Geologists have suggested that the dyke swarm is related to extensional tectonics.

See also
Bohus granite
Gothian orogeny
Jotnian
Satakunta dike swarms
Sveconorwegian orogeny

References

Dike swarms 
Mesoproterozoic magmatism
Geography of Østfold
Geography of Västra Götaland County
Geology of Norway
Geology of Sweden